This is a listing of the results for the women's K-1 500 metres competition in canoeing at the 1952 Summer Olympics.  The K-1 event is raced by single-person canoe sprint kayaks. Heat and semifinals took place on July 28.

Medalists

Heats
The 13 competitors first raced in three heats.  The top three finishers in each heat moved directly to the final.

Final

References

1952 Summer Olympics official report. p. 636.
Sports-reference.com women's 1952 K-1 500 m results.

Women's K-1 500
Olympic
Women's events at the 1952 Summer Olympics